Progress 42 was a Soviet unmanned Progress cargo spacecraft, which was launched in May 1990 to resupply the Mir space station.

Launch
Progress 42 launched on 5 May 1990 from the Baikonur Cosmodrome in the Kazakh SSR. It used a Soyuz-U2 rocket.

Docking
Progress 42 docked with the aft port of the Kvant-1 module of Mir on 7 May 1990 at 22:45:03 UTC, and was undocked on 27 May 1990 at 07:08:58 UTC.

Decay
It remained in orbit until 27 May 1990, when it was deorbited. The deorbit burn occurred at 11:40:00 UTC and the mission ended at 12:27:30 UTC.

See also

 1990 in spaceflight
 List of Progress missions
 List of uncrewed spaceflights to Mir

References

Progress (spacecraft) missions
1990 in the Soviet Union
Spacecraft launched in 1990
Spacecraft which reentered in 1990
Spacecraft launched by Soyuz-U rockets